During 1963–64 season Bologna F.C. competed in Serie A, Coppa Italia and Mitropa Cup.

Summary 
After World War II, the club was less successful. Throughout the 1950s and 1960s, the club generally floated between fourth, fifth and sixth position in the league, Things started to turn around when new manager and former 1928 Italy national team Olympian Fulvio Bernardini took his place on the Bologna touchline. On his resume, was Fiorentina's 1956 Serie A championship. On his arrival at the club, the side was already well stocked with talented players, but a few crucial ingredients were missing that would make Bologna true title contenders once again. Bernardini made several quality acquisition, such as the purchase of Harald Nielsen, a Denmark Olympic squad member who caught Bologna's eye at the Rome 1960 Games. Helmut Haller, the German international, also came on board. Like Nielsen, Haller was an amateur player who divided his time between football and driving a truck for a living. The club's owner, Renato Dall’Ara, personally went to Germany to sign the player. However, on his way back to Italy, Dall’Ara's car skidded off the road and crashed into a ditch. Without missing a beat, the old man emerged from the wreck waving Haller's contract and shouting, “Don’t worry about the accident, what matters is that we got this piece of paper signed!”

The next season, Haller and teammates like Ezio Pascutti with his spectacular diving headers delighted the Bologna faithful. However, they still only managed a fourth place finish and the finger was pointed at goalkeeper Santarelli, who at times was guilty of poor mistakes. The finishing touch came with the purchase of former Italy national team goalkeeper William Negri. Three wins a row launched the 1963/64 season, and despite a stuttering start after that, it was a win over Genoa that got Bologna's season back on track. The team regrouped and travelled to the San Siro for a difficult test against Inter. They played excellently, and Negri put in a top performance between the sticks, and the game ended in a goalless draw. From here, Bologna gained confidence and marched to ten successive victories, progressively making their way up the table. Nobody could believe what they were seeing. Even Helenio Herrera was shocked when his Inter lost in their second meeting. The Rossoblu kept moving towards their 7th Scudetto with a 2–1 win over AC Milan after which they found themselves leading both Milan clubs in the standings by three points. But three days after the Milan victory, everything came crashing down.

In March, the Italian Football Federation issued a statement that 5 Bologna players had tested positive for performance-enhancing drugs. They were immediately suspended and the club was docked 3 points. Everyone associated with Bologna FC was shocked, and nobody doubted the innocence of the players implicated for a moment. The notoriously tough and emotionless Fulvio Bernardini was in tears. So close to finally winning another title after a 23-year wait, it was about to be ripped away from them. Well, Bologna were having none of it. Protest marches exploded in the streets, the local media cried foul in the newspapers, and a team of Bolognese lawyers took on the case. While all this was happening, Renato Dall’Ara, by now an elderly man, was on the way out with a failing heart. The Bolognese prosecutor discovered that the tubes containing the urine samples from the players were not adequately sealed – therefore, anyone could have tampered with the specimens. In addition, the methamphetamine the samples contained was enough to kill a man. Meanwhile, other samples from the players, taken at the same time, were found perfectly sealed, in a double-locked refrigerator, with no traces of drugs whatsoever. The plot thickened. In the end, the players were acquitted of any wrongdoing. It was determined that the entire affair was an act of sabotage on behalf of the northern clubs to derail Bologna's season.

However, Bologna still lost 3 points while investigations continued and because of that, they struggled to keep up with Inter in the race for the Scudetto. The two teams matched each other win for win while Bologna anxiously awaited for the final investigation results. Finally it came – an established lack of evidence of any wrongdoing meant that the crucial three points would be returned to Bologna, bringing them level with Inter, with just three games to go. At the end of the season, both teams were still on equal points, which meant that for the first and only time in the history of the Serie A, a playoff would decide the ultimate champions. Four days before this penultimate match however, Bologna's emblematic president of 30 years, Renato Dall’Ara, died from a heart attack in the middle of a meeting in the offices of the Federation. The players were in tears, as Dall’Ara was not only their employer, he was like their father. Bologna's season from hell continued.: In his honour, Bologna took to the pitch against an Inter side who had just become European champions. Finally, the play-off kicked off.

After a goalless first half, the Bolognese side outclassed team from Milan and won 2–0. The Scudetto, to this day their last, was finally theirs, despite everything that had taken place. Bologna never gave up. Time and again, just when it seemed like it couldn't get any worse, it did – but they just kept on going and the reward for their perseverance was the Scudetto.

Squad 

 (Captain)

Transfers

Competitions

Serie A

League table

Matches

Championship tie-breaker

Coppa Italia

First round

Second round

Third round

Quarterfinals

Mitropa Cup

Quarterfinals

Semifinals

Statistics

Players statistics

Appearances
36.Helmut Haller
35.William Negri 
35.Harald Nielsen
35.Francesco Janich 
35.Carlo Furlanis 
34.Giacomo Bulgarelli
34.Romano Fogli
30.Marino Perani 
29.Paride Tumburus 
28.Mirko Pavinato 
25.Ezio Pascutti
16.Antonio Renna  
12.Bruno Capra
3.Héctor Demarco 
3.Bruno Franzini 
2.Edmondo Lorenzini 
1.Sidio Corradi

Goalscorers
22. Harald Nielsen 
8.Giacomo Bulgarelli 
8. Helmut Haller 
8. Ezio Pascutti
6. Marino Perani
1. Paride Tumburus 
1. Héctor Demarco 
1. Romano Fogli 
1. Carlo Furlanis

References

External links 
 

Bologna F.C. 1909 seasons
Bologna
Italian football championship-winning seasons